Leionema sympetalum, commonly known as Rylstone bell, is a  shrub with greenish-yellow tubular flowers in small terminal clusters at the end of smooth, angular branches.  It has a restricted distribution, grows near Rylstone in New South Wales.

Description
Flowering occurs from winter to spring.

Taxonomy
Rylstone bell was first formally described by Paul G. Wilson in 1970 and gave it the name Phebalium sympetalum, the description was published in the journal Nuytsia. In 1998 Wilson changed the name to Leionema sympetalum and published the name change in the journal Nuytsia.

Distribution and habitat
This species is confined to the ranges near Rylstone in New South Wales growing in dry sclerophyll forests on rocky outcrops.

Conservation status
This species is classified as "vulnerable" by the Government of New South Wales Environment Protection and Biodiversity Conservation Act 1999.

References

External links

sympetalum
Sapindales of Australia
Flora of New South Wales
Taxa named by Paul G. Wilson